The deepwater arrowtooth eel, Histiobranchus  bathybius, is a cutthroat eel of the genus Histiobranchus, found globally.

References
 
 
 Tony Ayling & Geoffrey Cox, Collins Guide to the Sea Fishes of New Zealand,  (William Collins Publishers Ltd, Auckland, New Zealand 1982) 

Synaphobranchidae
Fish described in 1877
Taxa named by Albert Günther